Høegh or Höegh may refer to:

People
 Aka Høegh (born 1947), Greenlandic artist
 Arnannguaq Høegh (1956–2020), Greenlandic artist
 Annelise Høegh (born 1948), Norwegian politician 
 Daniel Mathias Høegh (born 1991), Danish footballer
 Dennis Høegh (born 1989), Danish footballer
 Hans Høegh (1926–2010), Norwegian businessman 
 Leif Høegh (1896–1974), Norwegian shipowner
 Ole Peter Riis Høegh (1806–1852), Norwegian architect
 Simon Karenius Høegh (1810–1893), Norwegian bank treasurer

Companies
 Leif Höegh & Co, an international shipping company

See also
 Høgh, a surname (including a list of people with the name)